Racșa is a commune located in Satu Mare County, Romania. It is composed of two villages, Racșa and Racșa-Vii (Ráksahegy).

A commune until 1925, Racșa became part of Orașu Nou Commune that year and was again a separate commune from 1949 to 1956, when it was re-absorbed by Racșa Nou. In 2010, Racșa and Racșa-Vii were once again split off to form a commune.

References

Communes in Satu Mare County